The discography of The Band, a rock group, consists of ten studio albums, nine live albums, nine compilation albums, and thirty-three singles, as well as two studio and two live albums in collaboration with Bob Dylan. They were active from 1964 to 1976, and from 1983 to 1999. 

Since 1990, Capitol Records has re-released and expanded upon the versions of the early albums.

Studio albums

With Bob Dylan

Live albums

With Bob Dylan

Compilation albums

Other appearances

Studio

Live

Guest appearances

Singles

Notes and references

Notes
The single "Remedy" also peaked at number 71 on the RPM Country Tracks chart.

General
 
 

Specific

External links
 
 

Discography
Discographies of Canadian artists